Zag or ZAG may refer to:

Places
Zag, Kentucky, US
Zag, Mongolia, a district
Zag, Morocco, a town
Zagreb Airport, Croatia IATA airport code

People
Zag de Sujurmenza, 13th-century Spanish astronomer
Zag, of English band Zag and the Coloured Beads

Other uses
AZGP1 (Zinc-alpha-2-glycoprotein)
Zaghawa language, ISO 639-3 code
Zag numbers, a type of alternating permutation
Zag Industries, acquired by Stanley Black & Decker in 1990
Gonzaga Bulldogs, known unofficially as the Zags
TrueCar, Inc., formerly Zag.com

See also
Zig and Zag (disambiguation)
Zigzag (disambiguation)